The Wisconsin Interscholastic Athletic Association's Southeast Conference, nicknamed the "SEC", is a high school level athletic conference.  It is part of the WIAA.  Teams participating in the SEC are divided into two divisions: North and South.  The SEC is made up of:
Teams
Franklin Sabers
Oak Creek Knights
Kenosha Bradford Red Devils
Kenosha Indian Trail Hawks
Kenosha Tremper Trojans
Racine Case Eagles
Racine Horlick Rebels
Racine Park Panthers
(Muskego Warriors left the conference in 2013. They were replaced by Kenosha Indian Trail Hawks) 

The Southeast Conference is home to the 2005 Division 1 State Football Champions, the Racine Park Panthers; the 2006 Division 2 and 2021 Division 1 State Football Champions, the Franklin Sabers; and the 2011 Division 1 State Football Champions, the Kenosha Bradford Red Devils.

External links 
Southeast Conference website

Wisconsin high school sports conferences
High school sports conferences and leagues in the United States